Thomas Sawyer is the titular character of the Mark Twain novel The Adventures of Tom Sawyer (1876). He appears in three other novels by Twain: Adventures of Huckleberry Finn (1884), Tom Sawyer Abroad (1894), and Tom Sawyer, Detective (1896).

Sawyer also appears in at least three unfinished Twain works, Huck and Tom Among the Indians, Schoolhouse Hill, and Tom Sawyer's Conspiracy. While all three uncompleted works were posthumously published, only Tom Sawyer's Conspiracy has a complete plot, as Twain abandoned the other two works after finishing only a few chapters. It is set in the 1840s in the Mississippi.

Inspiration
The fictional character's name may have been derived from a jolly and flamboyant chief named Tom Sawyer, with whom Twain was acquainted in San Francisco, California, while Twain was employed as a reporter at The San Francisco Call. Twain used to listen to Sawyer tell stories of his youth, "Sam, he would listen to these pranks of mine with great interest and he'd occasionally take 'em down in his notebook. One day he says to me: ‘I am going to put you between the covers of a book some of these days, Tom.’ ‘Go ahead, Sam,’ I said, ‘but don’t disgrace my name.’" Twain himself said the character sprang from three people, later identified as: John B. Briggs (who died in 1907), William Bowen (who died in 1893) and Twain; however Twain later changed his story saying Sawyer was fully formed solely from his imagination, but as Robert Graysmith says, "The great appropriator liked to pretend his characters sprang fully grown from his fertile mind."

Portrayals
Actors who have portrayed Tom Sawyer in films and TV:
Jack Pickford (1917)
Gordon Griffith (1920)
Jackie Coogan (1930 and 1931)
Tommy Kelly (1938)
Billy Cook (1938)
Michael Miller (1944)
Robert Hyatt (1955, TV)
John Sharpe (1956, TV musical)
Kevin Schultz (1968 in the TV series The New Adventures of Huckleberry Finn)
Roland Demongeot (1968 in the French/German TV series Les Aventures de Tom Sawyer/Tom Sawyers und Huckleberry Finns Abenteuer)
Johnny Whitaker (1973)
Don Most (1975)
Sam Snyders (1979)
Fyodor Stukov (1981, Soviet three-episode TV miniseries, The Adventures of Tom Sawyer and Huckleberry Finn)
Chris Ritchie (1985 in the film The Adventures of Mark Twain)
Eugene Oakes (1986)
Raphael Sbarge (1990 in Back to Hannibal: The Return of Tom Sawyer and Huckleberry Finn) 
Jonathan Taylor Thomas (1995 in Tom and Huck) 
Rhett Akins (2000, voice)
Grey Griffin (2003 in The Fairly Oddparents, voice)
Shane West (2003 in The League of Extraordinary Gentlemen)
Louis Hofmann (2011, German version of The Adventures of Tom Sawyer)
Leon Seidel (2012, German version of The Adventures of Huckleberry Finn)
Joel Courtney (2014)
Adam Nee (2015)
Jeremy Shada (2015 in the 3DS game Code Name: S.T.E.A.M.)
Reilly Jacob (2016 in the TV series Once Upon a Time)

References

External links

The Adventures of Tom Sawyer by Mark Twain at Project Gutenberg
The Adventures of Tom Sawyer by Mark Twain at Archive.org

Mark Twain characters
Adventure film characters
Child characters in film
Child characters in literature
Child characters in musical theatre
Fictional characters from Missouri
Literary characters introduced in 1876
Male characters in literature
Orphan characters in literature